Mundele is a Congolese surname. Notable people with the surname include:

Benedicte Mundele (born 1993), Congolese fresh-food entrepreneur
Jean-Marc Makusu Mundele (born 1992), Congolese football player 

Surnames of African origin